Daniel Guadalupe López Valdez (born 14 March 2000) is a Mexican professional footballer who plays as a striker.

International career
In April 2019, López was included in the 21-player squad to represent Mexico at the U-20 World Cup in Poland.

Career statistics

Club

Honours
Atlante
Liga de Expansión MX: Apertura 2022

Mexico U17
CONCACAF U-17 Championship: 2017

Individual
CONCACAF U-17 Championship Best XI: 2017

References

External links

Noroeste debut (Spanish)
Daniel Lopez at Football Database

2000 births
Living people
Mexican footballers
Mexico youth international footballers
Club Tijuana footballers
Liga MX players
Footballers from Sinaloa
People from Ahome Municipality
Association football forwards
Mexico under-20 international footballers